Hucclecote is a civil parish in the Tewkesbury district, in the county of Gloucestershire, England. As of 2019, it has a population of 2,703. The parish doesn't include the Gloucester suburb of Hucclecote.

References

External links

Parish council
Hucclecote parish map, archived 2014 here.

Civil parishes in Gloucestershire
Borough of Tewkesbury